Herman Helleputte (born 22 March 1954) is a Belgian football defender and later manager. A one-club man while playing for Lierse, he is also best known for managing that club.

Honours

Manager
Germinal Ekeren
 Belgian Cup: 1996–97

References

1954 births
Living people
Belgian footballers
Lierse S.K. players
Belgian football managers
Lierse S.K. managers
Beerschot A.C. managers
K.S.K. Beveren managers
K.V.C. Westerlo managers
Association footballers not categorized by position
People from Lier, Belgium
Footballers from Antwerp Province